Events in the year 1963 in Taiwan, Republic of China. This year is numbered Minguo 52 according to the official Republic of China calendar.

Incumbents 
 President – Chiang Kai-shek
 Vice President – Chen Cheng
 Premier – Chen Cheng, Yen Chia-kan
 Vice Premier – Wang Yun-wu, Yu Ching-tang

Events

January
 11 January – The opening of Taipei Prison in Taoyuan County (now Taoyuan City).

February
 13 February – The 7.3  Su-ao earthquake occurred off the coast of Yilan County, causing some injuries and deaths.

September
 1 September – The declaration of Port of Hualien to be an international port.

October
 22 October – The establishment of National Research Institute of Chinese Medicine in Beitou District, Taipei.

Births
 24 February – Wu Chi-ming, member of Legislative Yuan
 26 February – Lu Wen-teh, golf athlete
 12 March – Kuang Li-chen, Magistrate of Taitung County
 18 March – Wei Ming-ku, Magistrate of Changhua County
 3 June – Chen Fu-hai, Magistrate of Kinmen County
 21 June – Tiger Huang, singer
 8 August – Yang Tzu-pao, Deputy Minister of Culture
 10 August – Lee Chia-fen, educator and politician
 14 September – Chu Chin-peng, Minister of Research, Development and Evaluation Commission (2009–2012)
 26 September – Huang Wei-cher, Mayor of Tainan
 21 October – Hsieh Chen-wu, lawyer and presenter
 6 November – Chang Hsien-yao, Deputy Minister of Mainland Affairs Council (2014)
 14 November – Tuan Yi-kang, member of 5th, 8th and 9th Legislative Yuan

Deaths
 3 January – Chu Chia-hua, former Vice Premier of the Republic of China.
 18 November – Puru, painter and calligrapher.

References

 
Years of the 20th century in Taiwan